Khatau Thakkar, popularly known as K. P. Thakkar  and KP, was an Indian athlete, swimmer and diving champion, who a gold medals in 1951 Asian Games in men's 3m springboard and 10m platform. Thakkar won a bronze medal in High Board Diving at the 1954 Asian Games, which was held in Manila. He was a National Diving Champion for several years. He was awarded the Dhyan Chand Award for Lifetime Achievement in 2014 by the Government of India. He had won three Asian Games medals. 

He died in October 2016 at the age of 84.

References 

Indian male divers
People from Maharashtra
Swimmers from Maharashtra
Asian Games medalists in diving
Divers at the 1951 Asian Games
Divers at the 1954 Asian Games
Asian Games gold medalists for India
Asian Games bronze medalists for India
Medalists at the 1951 Asian Games
Medalists at the 1954 Asian Games
1930s births
2016 deaths